Lombok Football Club is a Indonesian football team based in Mataram City, West Nusa Tenggara. They currently competes in the Liga 3 and their homebase is 17 December Stadium.

History 
Lombok FC was founded by Bambang Kristiono, member of the DPR-RI in the West Nusa Tenggara constituency 2. Through the HBK Peduli Foundation, Bambang then officially acquired the management of the Garuda Muda Academy.

Garuda Muda was previously led by the former captain of the provincial football team West Nusa Tenggara. With management by Bambang Kristiono who later changed the club's name to Lombok Football Club.

References

External links 

Football clubs in Indonesia
Football clubs in West Nusa Tenggara
Association football clubs established in 2021
2021 establishments in Indonesia